An ecological station in Brazil is a type of protected area of Brazil as defined by the National System of Conservation Units (SNUC).
The purpose is to preserve untouched representative samples of the different biomes in Brazil.

Objectives and restrictions

In the 1970s the Special Secretariat of the Environment under the environmentalist Paulo Nogueira Neto launched a program of estações ecológicas (ecological stations) with the aim of establishing a network of reserves that would protect representative samples of all Brazilian ecosystems.
The objective of an ecological station is to preserve nature and conduct scientific research. It establishes the right of eminent domain, with the private areas included in its boundaries requiring expropriation. In these areas, public visitation is prohibited, except for educational purposes, in accordance with the provisions of the Management Plan of the unit or specific regulation, and scientific research depends on previous authorization from the body responsible for the administration of the unit and is subject to the conditions and restrictions established by this body.

Changes to the environment in an ecological station are allowed to restore modified ecosystems, to manage species so as to preserve biodiversity and to collect specimens for scientific purposes. Changes are also allowed to conduct scientific research that affects the environment more than observation or collection, but in no more  or than or a maximum of 3% of the total area of the ecological station, whichever is smaller.

Selected list of ecological stations

References

Sources

Types of protected area of Brazil